Necrophilia has been a  topic in popular culture.

Necrophilia in fiction
Romantic connections between love and death are a frequent theme in Western artistic expression.
 In the Greek legend of the Trojan War, the Greek hero Achilles slays the Amazon queen Penthesilea in a duel. Upon removing her helmet and seeing her face, Achilles falls in love with her and mourns her death. The soldier Thersites openly ridicules Achilles and accuses him of necrophilia. Achilles responds by promptly killing Thersites with a single blow. (In some traditions, Thersites' accusation is not unfounded — Achilles was so stricken by Penthesilea's beauty that he could not control his lust for her, even after her death.)
 In Gabrielle Wittkop's first novel Le Necrophile (1972), the protagonist is a bisexual antiques shop owner who has sex exclusively with corpses (of all ages and genders), which he digs up from the Montparnasse Cemetery and then throws into the river.
 In Cormac McCarthy's Child of God (1973), protagonist Lester Ballard finds a dead couple in a car, and carries the female corpse back to his cabin to have sex with it.  After losing the corpse in a fire, he begins murdering women to create dead female sex partners for himself.
 In Stephen King's novel Under the Dome, Junior Rennie murders a woman whom he hates and has intercourse with her dead body.
 Georges Bataille's novella Story of the Eye ends with the main characters performing perverse and sacrilegious sexual acts on a passive priest, who is raped and strangled to death as he climaxes. After murdering him, the characters continue to perform sexual acts with his dismembered eyeball.
 Algernon Swinburne wrote a frankly necrophilic poem, "The Leper", in which a man keeps the body of his former lover in his house: "Love bites and stings me through, to see/Her keen face made of sunken bones./Her worn-off eyelids madden me,/That were shot through with purple once."
 Oscar Wilde's play, Salome, is based on the Biblical story of a Judean princess who performs the Dance of the Seven Veils for the Tetrarch, Herod, in exchange for the head of John the Baptist. When Salome finally receives the Christian prophet's head, she addresses it in an erotic monologue that has highly suggestive necrophiliac overtones.  Various artistic depictions of the story, particularly in the work of Gustave Moreau and Aubrey Beardsley, also hint at this subtext.
 In Christopher Moore's novel, Bloodsucking Fiends, when the police find the vampire Jody in Tommy's freezer, they think it's a dead body he's hiding so they send her to the morgue. The man working there is a necrophile and nearly molests her before she wakes up, giving him a heart attack that leads to his death. (She tucks his erection away so when he's found no one will suspect his dirty secret.)
 In Edgar Allan Poe's poem "Annabel Lee", there is a hint of the narrator's romantic necrophiliac desires, as suggested by his sleeping in his beloved's tomb all night.
 In C. M. Eddy, Jr.'s short story "The Loved Dead", the protagonist's actions revolve around his misunderstood feelings towards dead people. It starts with his own grandfather and progresses on toward necrophilia and becoming a serial killer to satisfy his desires.
 In Poppy Z. Brite's novel, Exquisite Corpse, the protagonist is a necrophile and serial killer.  He explains his behavior as a compensation for loneliness.
 Richard Brautigan's novel Dreaming of Babylon: A Private Eye Novel 1942 features a coroner who speaks openly of his attraction to female corpses, though he denies having intercourse with them.
 In The Secret Texts trilogy by Holly Lisle, Andrew Sabir of the Hellspawn Trinity often rapes the corpses of the dead before his cousin, Crispin, buries them in his famous garden. Crispin and Anwyn, who are the other members of the Trinity, find this habit of his disgusting, and make that known even in their introduction. Often, Andrew's victims are children, as the energy of children, especially little girls, is considered by those who practice both Wolf and Dragon magic to be the purest.
 In the video game The Elder Scrolls III: Morrowind, there is a mission in which the player must anger a creature called a Dremora into attacking. When the creature finally snaps, it threatens to rape the player's remains, mockingly promising that it will "be gentle." In the sequel, The Elder Scrolls IV: Oblivion, there is a Dunmer named Falanu Hlaalu, an alchemist in the city of Skingrad who rather suspiciously asks if you know the fine for necrophilia in Cyrodiil. If you choose to tell her the fine, which is 500 gold, she says enthusiastically: "That's nothing compared to Morrowind. Thanks." Other characters living in the city note that they have seen her in the graveyard with an odd smile on her face.
 In Grand Theft Auto IV the player meets a character named "Eddie Low", who is a serial killer, cannibal and necrophiliac, twice. The first time, he asks for a ride to the docks, where he disposes of a victim. The second time, the player character insults him, and Eddie attacks with a knife, intending to have sex with the player character's remains. The player is forced to kill Eddie.
 In Hideo Yamamoto's original manga of Ichi the Killer, the crime scene cleaner Inoue is depicted as a necrophile, and shown in silhouette having sex with the corpse of a 17-year-old girl whilst his coworkers prepare to bury her.
 Samuel Delany's 1969 novel, Hogg, is replete with detailed descriptions of erotic necrophilia.
 Patrick Bateman, the protagonist of the novel and film American Psycho, is depicted as engaging in acts of necrophilia, with bodies and parts of his victims.
 In Neil Gaiman's short story "Snow, Glass, Apples", the prince of Snow White is reimagined as having necrophiliac-like sexual tastes, preferring that his partners lie still and virtually unmoving while they have sex, to the extent that he is seduced by the vampire-esque Snow White.
 In Japanese manga and anime, the topic is many times present in the Ero guro subgenre.
 In the first chapter of Kaori Yuki's manga, Ludwig Revolution, Blanche discovers Prince Ludwig is a necrophile when she finds all the corpses in his bedroom.
 In Barbara Gowdy's short story "We Seldom Look on Love", a main character is depicted as a necrophile. Her lover is forced to take his life to be involved with her.
 Under writer Geoff Johns, Green Lantern villain Black Hand was reimagined as a necrophile.
 In Angela Carter's short story "The Snow Child" (published in The Bloody Chamber), the Count rapes the corpse of the girl.
 The 2011 video game L.A. Noire features a fictional necrophiliac named John Ferdinand Jamison. In the case "The Studio Secretary Murder," Ferdinand confesses to kissing and putting lipstick on the corpse of murder victim Evelyn Summers, much to the disgust of the player, Cole Phelps', partner, Rusty Galloway, who punches Jamison in the face two separate times.
 The sixth chapter of Derek Pell's Doktor Bey's Book of the Dead includes a listing of the "7 Joys of Necrophilia".
 In Tamsyn Muir's novel Gideon the Ninth, the character Harrowhark Nonagesimus is shown to have fallen in love with the corpse of Alecto the First, referred to as "the Body". In the sequel novel, Harrow the Ninth, the Lyctor Gideon the First (potentially possessed by the spirit of his cavalier, Pyrrha Dve) is shown kissing the corpse of fellow Lyctor Cytherea the First (potentially possessed by the spirit of Pyrrha's lover Commander Wake); another character suggests that he may have also engaged in necrophilia with the corpse.
 In Supervert's collection, Necrophilia Variations, the stories "appear to be drawn straight from Aggrawal's ten-tier classification of necrophilia, but reimagined by Bataille or the Marquis de Sade."

Necrophilia in film and television

 In The Strange World of Coffin Joe (1968), a short story titled "Tara" revolves around a lead character who breaks into the mausoleum containing the coffin of a beautiful woman, who he saw passing daily. He removes her burial wedding dress, has sex with the body and performs foot fetishism.
 The B movie Sweet Kill (1973) revolves around a lead character who becomes aroused only by dead bodies.
 The 1976 film In the Realm of the Senses fictionalizes the case of Sada Abe. Sada, a former prostitute who now works as a maid in a hotel begins an intense affair with its owner, Kichizo Ishida, that consists of sexual experiments and various self-indulgences. Ishida leaves his wife to pursue his affair with Sada. Sada becomes increasingly possessive and jealous of him, and he more eager to please her. Their mutual obsession escalates to the point where Ishida finds she is most excited by strangling him during lovemaking, and he is killed in this fashion. Sada then severs his penis and writes, "Sada Kichi the two of us forever," in blood on his chest.
 The 1977 John Waters film Desperate Living contains a scene where Princess Coo-Coo (Mary Vivian Pearce) is seen in bed with her recently deceased boyfriend.
 In 1980, artist John Duncan produced Blind Date, a film in which he reportedly had sex with a human cadaver.
 The protagonist in Dominique Deruddere's 1987 film Crazy Love, based on various writings by author and poet Charles Bukowski, has sex with a dead woman in the third and final act.
 The 1987 and 1991 controversial German underground films Nekromantik and its sequel (both directed by Jörg Buttgereit) offer a graphic portrayal of sexual necrophilia.
 In a scene in the film Leatherface: The Texas Chainsaw Massacre III, the character Alfredo Sawyer is depicted as passionately kissing a severed and heavily decayed head as he disposes of body parts in a swamp.
 In the 1990 film Singapore Sling, a daughter is shown having sex with her late father, who is now a mummified corpse.
 A 1991 Taggart episode, "Nest of Vipers", featured a plotline where a necrophiliac used venomous animals to commit murders.
 The 1994 film Aftermath directed by Nacho Cerdà deals with necrophilia in a morgue.
 The 1996 Canadian film Kissed, starring Molly Parker, centers around a young woman's increasingly romantic fascination with corpses.
 In the Family Guy episode "Death is a Bitch", Death (represented by the Grim Reaper) continues to have intercourse with a woman after he kills her with his touch. In the later episode "I Take Thee Quagmire", Glen Quagmire asks Death if he can have the corpse of his deceased ex-wife "for a few minutes", implying that, among other things, Quagmire could be a necrophile. This was proved in the episode "And Then There Were Fewer" when Quagmire leaves with Stephanie's dead body.
 The 2000 film Quills depicts a dream where the Abbé in charge of the Marquis de Sade's asylum fondles and fornicates with a dead laundress. In it, she comes back to life during sex, then returns to a corpse once he realizes his actions.
 Takashi Miike's 2001 film Visitor Q contains a scene where a man rapes and accidentally kills a woman, and then decides to have sex with her before chopping her body into pieces. While having sex, the body goes into rigor mortis and his penis gets stuck.
 In the 2001 film Mortel Transfert, a psychoanalyst thwarts an attempt by the ground keeper to engage sexual activity with the body of his recently deceased client he was attempting to dispose of.
 In the 2002 independent horror film I'll Bury You Tomorrow, the protagonist, a necrophiliac, pursues employment at a mortuary for access to cadavers.
 In the television series Sons of Anarchy, a club member named Tig Trager admits to the club president that he engages in sexual activities with corpses.
 In Haute Tension, the antagonist performs fellatio on himself with a severed head.
 The 2004 film Murder-Set-Pieces features the main character (Sven Garrett) performing fellatio on himself with what is later revealed to be a severed head.
 The Season 2 episode of Puppets Who Kill, "Dan and the Necrophiliac", features a female necrophiliac who is caught having sex with her dead uncle at his funeral. Later in the episode the character of Dan Barlow (Dan Redican), who is attracted to her, fakes his own death so that she will violate his corpse.
 In Rob Zombie's House of 1000 Corpses and The Devil's Rejects, Otis B. Driftwood is a rapist and a necrophiliac. He is seen in one scene sleeping with a dead body of a woman he presumably killed, and when shown a picture of a dead cheerleader and told that "she isn't so fuckable now", Otis responds that she is.
 The film Freddy vs. Jason depicts a scene where Freddy Krueger has sex with the body of a dead girl; also, in Wildstorm's Nightmare on Elm Street comics, Freddy is implicated as having molested the dead bodies of children.
 The Season 3 episode of Nip/Tuck titled "Frankenlaura" features a necrophiliac mortician who preserves the body of his dead sister in order to make love to it.
 In the animated TV series Drawn Together, Captain Hero has experienced attraction to corpses on multiple occasions, and at one point throws a tantrum due to being unable to find a dead body he was told about.
 The Criminal Minds episode "Cold Comfort" features a necrophiliac serial killer who kills women so he can have sex with the bodies, believing them to be his dead au pair Abbey. Also, in the episode "Sex, Birth, Death", Dr. Reid is sought out by Nathan Harris (Anton Yelchin), a teenage boy who is having necrophiliac urges, much to his disturbance. Nathan is then psychoanalyzed, where he admits that the sight of the cadavers that his mother (a college professor) works with sexually arouses him.
 The character Theodore "T-Bag" Bagwell in Prison Break "raped and killed children, and not always in that order".
 The film Idlewild (2006) depicted a scene in which musician-mortician Percival, played by Andre 3000, sings a romantic song to his dead girlfriend as he gazes longingly at her half-dressed corpse, which he embalms, applies makeup to and dresses up.
 In the 2009 film Necromentia, the character Hagen is accused of having engaged in necrophilia on multiple occasions with his dead lover.
 In Season 2 of the TV series The Following, identical twin Luke Gray appears to have an interest in necrophilia.
 In the 2012 film 3AM, segment A Funeral Home, the story centers on junior mortician Tod, who develops an intimate relationship with Cherry's corpse.
 In the 2012 Japanese animated series Psycho-Pass, one of the sub-antagonists Rikako Ouryou is involved in acts of necrophilia before performing plastination on them.
 In the 2014 film The Midnight After, a segment depicts a certain character briefly occupied with necrophiliac activity on another previous passenger.
 In the 2015 film The Corpse of Anna Fritz, an orderly at a hospital and his friend have sex with Anna's corpse and begins raping it.
 In the 2016 film The Neon Demon, a female character has sex with the deceased body of another woman in a morgue, leading the media to call it 'lesbian necrophilia'.
 In the 2020 film Her Name Was Christa, the main character has sex with his dead girlfriend after she overdoses on drugs.
 In the Solar Opposites episode "The Unstable Grey Hole", Korvo mentions that he often digs up human corpses from a cemetery and has sex with them.
 In an episode of the original Charmed, one of the sisters makes a joke about Piper being a necrophiliac.

Necrophilia in music
 In the music video for the song "Velvet", Norwegian band A-ha portrays the band as murder victims, opening with Morten Harket as a dead man in a bathtub: a girl killed him by electrocution, dropping a plugged hairdryer in the tub. Throughout the video he is taken to the morgue, tagged, etc., all the while singing the lyrics. Paul Waaktaar-Savoy plays his guitar while apparently dead from a gunshot to the head (shot by a girl who looks very similar to the girl who killed Morten), and Magne Furuholmen's body is found in a freezer. All three continue singing and playing while being brought to the morgue, and within it. Some scenes in the morgue controversially suggest necrophilia.  The director of this video was Harald Zwart, who also directs Hollywood movies. Zwart, a fellow Norwegian, chose this song to be a part of his new film at the time, One Night at McCool's. The so-called "licking version" of this video appears on the international DVD release of One Night at McCool's, as well as on the DVD enclosed with the deluxe edition of 25, where it is labeled as "European Cut". The "licking version" got its name because it features the older nurse seen near the end of the video licking Morten's lips instead of kissing him. A-ha was criticized by some for playing with necrophilia in this music video, even though that was not the band’s intent and they felt it was more of a fun piece.
 In the videoclip "Meaningless" by Pain of Salvation a girl has a sexual intercourse with Daniel Gildenlow's corpse.
 English punk rock group Charged G.B.H recorded a song titled "Necrophilia".
 Satirical songwriter Tom Lehrer, whose 1950s recordings mentioned many topics not normally openly discussed in those days, referenced a friend of his who "wrote a heartwarming story about a young necrophiliac who finally achieved his lifelong ambition by becoming Coroner!" Lehrer gave the audience a few seconds to murmur in bewilderment, and then said, "The rest of you can look it up when you get home!"
 Jimmy Cross's song "I Want My Baby Back" is a parody of the morbid teenage tragedy song genre that was popular in the late 1950s and early 1960s.
 The Geto Boys' song "Mind of a Lunatic" (from the 1989 album Grip It! On That Other Level and the 1990 Def American release) has a lyric where Bushwick Bill as a serial rapist kills a woman and has sex with a corpse; the remake of the song "Skitso" (1992) on his album Little Big Man has this reference.
 Notorious transgressive punk rocker GG Allin performed two songs dealing with necrophilia. The first, entitled "Fuck the Dead", appears on (among others) the album Dirty Love Songs. The second, entitled "Anal Cunt" and appearing on the album Brutality and Bloodshed for All, is specifically about anal sex with a corpse and contains such lyrics as "You're my beast, your soul has gone away/But your dead anal cunt will be my fuck of fucks today."
 One of the main themes in The Doug Anthony All Stars CD/video release Dead & Alive is necrophilia. "Necrophilia comes from the Latin 'necros' meaning 'dead' and 'philia,' the verb, 'to fill.' And I notice when I say that word 'necrophilia,' a lot of the younger people up the front visibly stiffen. The older mob up the back begin to look a bit scared. And quite rightly so."
 of Montreal's song "Chrissy Kiss The Corpse" features a titular woman whose "vile hobby" is "fondling the dead".
 The song "Corpse in my Bed" by Creature Feature concerns a protagonist whom keeps the corpse of a woman within his home after unearthing her. The singer "could never think of leaving her side, even though it's been years since she died."
 Progressive metal outfit Savatage wrote a song titled "Necrophilia" which was released on the album Power of the Night.
 A Midnite Choir's "Amelia" is a love song by an admirer of the titular person, who is a necrophile.
 In the 1970s, shock rocker Alice Cooper recorded four songs about necrophilia: "I Love the Dead", "Blue Turk," "Refrigerator Heaven", and "Cold Ethyl".
 Rammstein wrote a song called "Heirate mich" (Marry me) in which a man digs up his dead girlfriend and "takes what's still there".
 Horror punk band Murderdolls, led by Wednesday 13, has created a life style out of singing about necrophilia and sexual acts with the dead.
 Punk rock band T.S.O.L. had a minor hit with "Code Blue", a song that justifies necrophilia by claiming (among other things) that the singer can, "Do what I want and [she] won't complain."
 The song "Nekrofelia" by Danish psychobilly band Nekromantix is about necrophilia.
 American deathcore band Whitechapel's album The Somatic Defilement includes a great deal of nercrophilic themes throughout.
 In 1993, a music video for Tom Petty's hit song "Mary Jane's Last Dance" featured the singer simulating various romantic poses with a dead woman (Kim Basinger).
 In 2000, comedian Stephen Lynch released a song called "A Month Dead" about a necrophile whose lover is beginning to smell on his album A Little Bit Special.
 British metal band Cradle of Filth released a poster with vocalist Dani Filth standing in a cemetery, with the words "Dead Girls Don't Say 'No'".
 British grindcore band Raging Speedhorn wrote a song called "Necrophiliac Glue-Sniffer".
 Thrash metal band Slayer have many songs concerning necrophilia. They released "Necrophiliac" on Hell Awaits, "Dead Skin Mask" (about Ed Gein) on Seasons in the Abyss and yet another track on Divine Intervention about Jeffrey Dahmer called "213".
 Brotha Lynch Hung, a hardcore rapper from Sacramento is one of the most gruesome and explicitally violent lyricists with songs graphically chronicling a life filled by drug use and sale, promiscuity, ultra-violence, rape, infanticide, necrophilia, and cannibalism.
 Horrorcore rap group Wolfpac released a song called "Death Becomes Her", about having sex with a dead girl and eventually having to hide the body from the police.
 Black metal band Mayhem released a song "Necrolust" on their 1987 Deathcrush EP.
 Swedish Death metal band Tribulation released a song "Crypt of Thanatophilia" on their 2009 debut 'The Horror'.
 Killing Miranda released a song "Burn Sinister". Choice lyrics snippets: "away from prying eyes", "my cold dead flesh", "romance this rotting meat", "the smell of formaldehyde and perfume"....
 Voltaire wrote a song on his album Almost Human called "Dead Girls", about a man being convicted for fornicating with the deceased in a morgue. Another song, on the album Ooky Spooky, is titled "Zombie Prostitute".
 Cannibal Corpse has many songs about necrophilia and corpse defiling, such as "I Cum Blood", "Necropedophile", "Dismembered and Molested" and "Gallery of Suicide". Ironically they also have songs about the dead coming back to life and raping the living, like "Necrosadistic Warning" and "Post Mortem Ejaculation" and even songs about zombies having sex, like "Unite the Dead." Vocalist George "Corpsegrinder" Fisher says that "the songs are all in good faith, and are not meant to offend real necrophiles, despite offending everyone else."
 Cradle of Filth's song "Lord Abortion" is thought to be about necrophilia, based on lyrics and a female voice at the introduction that says "Care for a little necrophilia, hm?". This line was borrowed from a line spoken by Kim Greist in the film Brazil.
 Noise musician Atrax Morgue's work revolves heavily around necrophilia; track titles include "Necrosadism", "Esthetik of a Corpse", "Cold Pleasure", "Necrophile Lust", and the "Necrophiliac Experience" series.
 The song "A Little Piece of Heaven" on the self-titled album by Avenged Sevenfold describes his necrophilic act. "Cause I really always knew that my little crime would be cold/that's why I got a heater for your thighs" "She was never this good in bed even when she was sleeping/now she's just so perfect I've never been so fucking deep in." In the song, it is about a man who kills his girlfriend when she laughs at him, when he proposes. She comes back to life and kills him, then they both come back from the grave, get married and go on a murder spree. In the video, this is all shown as a cartoon and the man has sex with the corpse of his girlfriend after he kills her.
 The song "Last Kiss Goodbye" by Lordi talks about hiding a girl's body, and being in love with her.
 Norwegian Black Metal band Ancient's song "Willothewisp" is about a man's love story with his dead lover, which is depicted in the video clip.
 The Black Dahlia Murder released the song "A Vulgar Picture". It tells the story of a man going into a grave to dig up his dead wife. They also released a song titled "Deatmask Divine" featuring the lyrics "I could never let you go my darling cold and blue / I wonder are you dreaming still spread eagle blood removed / I weave the sucking trocar beneath your bruising skin / tonight I'll lay beside you darling in necromantic sin"
 The Rob Zombie song "Demonoid Phenomenon" features samples from the 1971 film Daughters of Darkness (Les Lèvres Rouges), one of which is "You actually enjoyed seeing that dead girl's body".
 The Mars Volta released a song in 2009 called "Halo of Nembutals" containing the lyrics "They send in the necrophiliacs".
 The song Cemetery by the Canadian rock band Headstones is about a girlfriend "from the wrong side of town", featuring the lyrics "Went down to the cemetery looking for love / Got there and my baby was buried - I had to dig her up".
 Rapper DMX referred to being a necrophiliac in the song "Bring Your Whole Crew" on his 1998 album Flesh of My Flesh, Blood of My Blood when he rapped "...got blood on my dick 'cause I fucked a corpse".
 The aggrotech artist Suicide Commando released a song called "Necrophilia" on his debut album Critical Stage released in 1994.
 The horrorcore rapper King Gordy talks about raping and licking a young girl who has been dead for weeks on the song "Mr 187" in 2009.
 Shock rock band The Murder Groupies occasionally performed a song live titled N.D.Q (Necrophiliac Drag Queens).
 OFWGKTA member and rapper Tyler, The Creator talks about having sex with the corpse of a girl who wouldn't go to prom with him in the song "Sarah" from his first album Bastard. He also raps about having sex with the corpse of a girl who rejected him in a forest in the song "She" with Frank Ocean from his second album Goblin.
 Half Man Half Biscuit's song "Excavating Rita" from their album 90 Bisodol (Crimond) concerns a bereaved Betterware salesman who engages in necrophilia and is sectioned as a result.
 In Canadian comedian Jon Lajoie's "WTF Collective 3", one of the MC's name is "MC Necrophiliac".
 Gothic metalcore band Motionless in White released a song named "Whatever You Do...Don't Push the Red Button" on their 2009 EP, When Love Met Destruction. The song tells a story of a man who unburies his deceased lover and has sex with her body and is most notorious for its ending breakdown where Chris Cerulli screams "I bet that I fucked more dead girls than you."
 Rapper Kanye West includes the lyric "Have you ever had sex with a pharaoh? Uh, put the pussy in a sarcophagus" on his song "Monster".
 Drag Queen Sharon Needles recorded the song "Dead Girls Never Say No" for her debut album PG-13, inspired by the relationship between Carl Tanzler and the corpse of Elena Milagro "Helen" de Hoyos.
 Horror folk band Harley Poe includes themes of necrophilia in their music, especially the song "Corpse Grindin' Man."
 Finnish singer-songwriter Mirel Wagner included the song "No Death" on her self-titled 2011 debut album. The song was released as a single in August, 2011. In the song the narrator describes the appearance of their deceased and rotting lover and the acts they perform on them before the corpse eventually disintegrates.
 "Necromancer", from the Gnarls Barkley album "St. Elsewhere (album)", contains themes of necrophilia.
 The song "Rotten", by Missouri Surf Club, describes a man who "pulls (the subject) straight from the coffin" and proceeds to have sex with them.

References

Popular culture
Sexuality in popular culture
Topics in popular culture